Miss World Philippines 2016 was the 6th edition of the Miss World Philippines pageant. It was held at the Manila Hotel Tent City in Manila, Philippines on October 2, 2016.

At the end of the event, Hillarie Parungao crowned Catriona Gray as Miss World Philippines 2016. Arienne Calingo was named as First Princess, Ivanna Kamil Pacis as Second Princess, Marah Muñoz as Third Princess, and Sandra Lemonon as Fourth Princess.

Gray represented the Philippines at the Miss World 2016 pageant in Washington, D.C., United States and finished as a Top 5 finalist.

Results
Color keys
  The contestant was a Semi-Finalist in an International pageant.

Special Awards

Contestants 
24 contestants competed the title.

Notes

Post-pageant Notes 

 Aside from finishing as a Top 5 finalist at Miss World 2016, Catriona Gray also won the Multimedia challenge. She is also among the Top 5 candidates for Beauty With a Purpose. After her stint in Miss World, Gray competed at Binibining Pilipinas 2018 where she was crowned as Binibining Pilipinas Universe 2018. She competed at Miss Universe 2018 in Bangkok and won.
 Sandra Lemonon also competed at Binibining Pilipinas 2018 where she finished as a Top 15 semifinalist. Lemonon then competed at the inaugural edition of Miss Universe Philippines where she finished as a Top 16 semifinalist.

References

External links
 Official Miss World Philippines website

World Philippines
2016 in the Philippines
2016